Stefan M. Kostka (born 1939) is an American music theorist, author, and Professor Emeritus of music theory at the University of Texas at Austin.

Education
Kostka graduated from the University of Colorado with a Bachelor's Degree, and then received a graduate degree at the University of Texas, studying under Kent Kennan before receiving a PhD in music theory from the University of Wisconsin.

Career
He was a member of the faculty of the Eastman School of Music from 1969 to 1973, and since that time has been on the faculty at the University Texas at Austin. Kostka initiated courses in computer applications in music at both the Eastman School and the University of Texas. Later, he specialized in courses in atonal theory and contemporary styles and techniques.

Selected publications

Books
 The Hindemith String Quartets: A Computer-Assisted Study of Selected Aspects of Style, Doctoral dissertation, University of Wisconsin–Madison, 1969
 A Bibliography of Computer Applications in Music, J. Boonin, 1974
 
 Materials and Techniques of Twentieth Century Music, Prentice Hall, 1990; 5th ed., Materials and Techniques of Post-Tonal Music, with Matthew Santa, Routledge, 2018.
 Anthology of Music for Analysis, with Roger Graybill, Prentice Hall, 2003

Articles
 1971: "Recent developments in computer-assisted musical scholarship", Computers and the Humanities, vol. 6, issue 1, pp. 15–21
 1991: "Changing philosophies of undergraduate music theory instruction: Practical implications and recommendations", The Quarterly Journal of Music Teaching and Learning, vol. 2, no. 4, pp. 30–37. (with Russell Riepe) (via Rider University)

References

1939 births
Living people
American music theorists
University of Texas at Austin faculty
Eastman School of Music faculty
University of Texas at Austin College of Fine Arts alumni
University of Colorado alumni
University of Wisconsin–Madison College of Letters and Science alumni